"So Far Away" is a song by the American heavy metal band Avenged Sevenfold, released as the third single for their fifth studio album, Nightmare. The single was released on April 5, 2011 via Warner Bros. The song is a tribute to the band's original drummer Jimmy "The Rev" Sullivan, who died in December 2009.

Overview 
It is the band's third single released without former drummer The Rev, who died of an opioid overdose on December 28, 2009. In late March All Access Music Group mentioned that the third single from the album Nightmare would be "So Far Away", scheduled to be played on the radio starting on April 5, 2011.

Writing 
In the special edition of Revolver magazine that was released the same day as the Nightmare album, Gates stated that he originally started out writing the song "So Far Away" in honor of his grandfather. However, the song is now primarily about his former bandmate, best friend and previous drummer of Avenged Sevenfold, The Rev, who died on December 28, 2009.

This was the first Avenged Sevenfold song Gates wrote completely by himself since "I Won't See You Tonight Pt 1" on Waking the Fallen. During most concerts, the band performs the song as a tribute to the Rev by having the audience hold up their lighters or cell phones during the song as the stage background features a banner commemorating the Rev's legacy.

Music video 
The music video (directed by Wayne Isham) features the four remaining members of the band playing in a studio and also riding in a Cadillac DeVille  through a neighborhood (possibly Huntington Beach, where the band originated). Throughout the video, flashbacks of the four play. They are shown as children playing in a garage, then teens playing and hanging out, and stealing beer from a liquor store. There is a scene in the video in which a young Sullivan is depicted riding the handlebars of a bike being ridden by a young M. Shadows, kicking over a metal trash can on the street. Shadows referenced this when talking about Sullivan before playing So Far Away at Rock am Ring 2014. ("we've known this guy since we were this big, rolling round the neighborhood, knocking over trash cans; just being dickheads"). During the bridge, a collection of photos and videos of the Rev play. It ends with a clip of the remaining band members and James embracing.

Avenged Sevenfold posted a countdown on their official website that showed the time until release for a new video for "So Far Away". SFA7X When the video was released, the site crashed due to so many people attempting to watch the video at once. After a second failed attempt to release the video, they solved the problem by hosting the music video on YouTube.

This was the second video not to feature the current drummer for Avenged Sevenfold; the first being Nightmare. For this music video, Synyster Gates uses a custom Schecter guitar, similar to his usual black/silver pinstriped guitar. However instead of the inlays on the fretboard reading "SYN", it displays "REV". Johnny Christ also wore a guitar strap with the word "foREVer" written on it.

As of October 2022, it has over 304 million views on YouTube.

Chart performance
The song reached number one on the Billboard Hot Mainstream Rock Tracks chart and peaked at number 15 on the Alternative Songs chart. This is the band's first number-one single.

Track listing

Charts

Weekly charts

Year-end charts

Personnel
Avenged Sevenfold
 M. Shadows – lead vocals
 Zacky Vengeance – acoustic guitar, backing vocals
 Synyster Gates – lead guitar, backing vocals
 Johnny Christ – bass
Additional musicians
 Mike Portnoy – drums
 Brian Haner Sr. – acoustic guitar
Production
Mike Elizondo – producer
Andy Wallace – mixing
Ted Jensen – mastering

References

2011 singles
Avenged Sevenfold songs
Rock ballads
Music videos directed by Wayne Isham
Song recordings produced by Mike Elizondo
Warner Records singles